Kickboxing at the 2017 Asian Indoor and Martial Arts Games was held at the Muay Kickboxing Arena in Ashgabat, Turkmenistan from 23 to 26 September 2017.

Medalists

Kick light

Point fighting

Full contact

Low kick

Medal table

Results

Kick light

Men's 69 kg

Men's 74 kg

Women's 60 kg

Point fighting

Men's 69 kg

Men's 79 kg

Women's 59 kg

Full contact

Men's 57 kg

Men's 67 kg

Men's 75 kg

Women's 56 kg

Low kick

Men's 51 kg

Men's 63.5 kg

 Muhammet Altybaýew of Turkmenistan originally won the gold medal, but was disqualified after he tested positive for Meldonium and Luteinizing hormone.

Men's 71 kg

Men's 81 kg

Women's 52 kg

References

External links 
 Official website

2017 Asian Indoor and Martial Arts Games events
2017
Asian Indoor and Martial Arts Games